Bill Meakes (born 23 February 1991) is an Australian professional rugby union player currently playing for LA Giltinis of Major League Rugby (MLR). He also has represented Australia in rugby sevens.

Meakes was previously contracted to the Western Force in Perth and Gloucester in the English Premiership. His usual position is centre.

Early life
Meakes was born in Manly on Sydney's Northern Beaches. He attended St Joseph's College, Hunters Hill and during his final year there in 2008 was selected to represent New South Wales at the Australian Schools Rugby Championships.

Rugby career
Meakes played his club rugby at Northern Suburbs and then Randwick. In 2011 he played for the Australia U20 team that finished third at the IRB Junior World Championship, defeating France by 30–17 in the third place playoff. He was also capped for Australia sevens, playing in the 2011–12 IRB Sevens World Series.

In 2013, Meakes moved to England as he played for Clifton RFC, a local rugby union club based in Bristol. In early 2014, Meakes linked up with Gloucester Rugby having played for Clifton since his arrival in the UK as a non-contracted player. He did enough to earn an academy contract for the 2014–15 season. On 15 January 2015, Meakes signed his first professional contract with Gloucester since his move to the English club became permanent.

In 2016, Meakes was released from his contract with Gloucester to make his debut in Super Rugby with Perth-based Western Force from the 2017 season.

Following a year with Western Force, Meakes signed with rivals Melbourne Rebels for both the 2018 and 2019 Super Rugby seasons. He signed a one-year contract extension with the Rebels for the 2020 Super Rugby season.

On 28 October 2020, Meakes returns to England to sign with Premiership side London Irish on a short-term deal until the end of January 2021 as injury cover.

He joined Major League Rugby side LA Giltinis following his time at London Irish. He competed for Australia at the 2022 Rugby World Cup Sevens in Cape Town.

Super Rugby statistics

References

External links
Gloucester Rugby Profile
ESPN scrum Profile

Living people
1991 births
Australian rugby union players
Gloucester Rugby players
Australian expatriate rugby union players
Expatriate rugby union players in England
Perth Spirit players
Western Force players
Melbourne Rebels players
Melbourne Rising players
London Irish players
Expatriate rugby union players in the United States
Australian rugby sevens players
Rugby union centres
LA Giltinis players
Chicago Hounds (rugby union) players
Clifton RFC players